Trenton is an unincorporated community and census-designated place (CDP) in northwestern Williams County, North Dakota, United States.  It lies along North Dakota Highway 1804 southwest of the city of Williston, the county seat of Williams County.  Its elevation is 1,900 feet (579 m).  It has a post office with the ZIP code 58853. The community lies 220 miles north-west of Bismarck. It was first listed as a CDP prior to the 2020 census.

Demographics

Climate
According to the Köppen Climate Classification system, Trenton has a semi-arid climate, abbreviated "BSk" on climate maps.

Education
It is within the Eight Mile School District.

References

Unincorporated communities in Williams County, North Dakota
Unincorporated communities in North Dakota
Census-designated places in Williams County, North Dakota
Census-designated places in North Dakota